Matías Sánchez Pages (born 20 September 1996) is an Argentine professional volleyball player. He is a member of the Argentina national team, and a bronze medallist at the Olympic Games Tokyo 2020. At the professional club level, he plays for Ślepsk Malow Suwałki.

Honours

Clubs
 National championships
 2014/2015  Argentine Cup, with Bolívar Vóley
 2018/2019  Argentine Cup, with Obras de San Juan

Youth national team
 2012  CSV U19 South American Championship
 2015  FIVB U21 World Championship
 2016  U23 Pan American Cup
 2017  FIVB U23 World Championship

Individual awards
 2013: FIVB U19 World Championship – Best Setter
 2015: FIVB U21 World Championship – Best Setter
 2016: Pan American Cup – Best Setter
 2016: U23 Pan American Cup – Best Setter
 2017: FIVB U23 World Championship – Best Setter
 2018: Pan American Cup – Best Setter
 2019: Pan American Games – Best Setter
 2019: CSV South American Championship – Best Setter

References

External links
 Player profile at PlusLiga.pl 
 Player profile at Volleybox.net
 
 

1996 births
Living people
People from San Juan, Argentina
Sportspeople from San Juan Province, Argentina
Argentine men's volleyball players
Olympic volleyball players of Argentina
Volleyball players at the 2020 Summer Olympics
Medalists at the 2020 Summer Olympics
Olympic medalists in volleyball
Olympic bronze medalists for Argentina
Volleyball players at the 2019 Pan American Games
Medalists at the 2019 Pan American Games
Pan American Games medalists in volleyball
Pan American Games gold medalists for Argentina
Argentine expatriate sportspeople in Brazil
Expatriate volleyball players in Brazil
Argentine expatriate sportspeople in France
Expatriate volleyball players in France
Argentine expatriate sportspeople in Poland
Expatriate volleyball players in Poland
Ślepsk Suwałki players
Setters (volleyball)